The Kyungon Bridge is a bridge on the Wakema–Kyungon–Myinkaseik–Pathein Road across the Pyamalaw River between Wakema Township and Einme Township in Ayeyawady Region of Burma (Myanmar).

Using the Kyungon Bridge to travel from Wakema to Pathein, it is only  and thus is the shortest route from Wakema to Pathein. The bridge was opened on 25 October 2009. The bridge was commissioned on 20 March 2022, by State Administration Council members Aye Nu Sein and Moung Har as part of the 77th Armed Forces Day celebration.

Notes

Bridges in Myanmar
Buildings and structures in Ayeyarwady Region